Aberdeen is a city in North East Scotland, and is the third most populous city in the country. Aberdeen has a long, sandy coastline and features an oceanic climate, with cool summers and mild, rainy winters.

During the mid-18th to mid-20th centuries, Aberdeen's buildings incorporated locally quarried grey granite, which may sparkle like silver because of its high mica content. Since the discovery of North Sea oil in 1969, Aberdeen has been known as the offshore oil capital of Europe.  Based upon the discovery of prehistoric villages around the mouths of the rivers Dee and Don, the area around Aberdeen has been thought to have been settled for at least 6,000 years.

Aberdeen received royal burgh status from David I of Scotland (1124–1153), which transformed the city economically. The traditional industries of fishing, paper-making, shipbuilding, and textiles have been overtaken by the oil industry and Aberdeen's seaport. Aberdeen Heliport is one of the busiest commercial heliports in the world, and the seaport is the largest in the north-east part of Scotland. There are two universities in Aberdeen: the University of Aberdeen, founded in 1495 and located in Old Aberdeen, and Robert Gordon University which is located in Garthdee area and received university status in 1992.

In 2012, HSBC named Aberdeen as a leading business hub and one of eight 'super cities' spearheading the UK's economy, marking it as the only city in Scotland so designated. In 2018, Aberdeen was found to be the best city in the UK to start a business in a study released by card payment firm Paymentsense.

History

The Aberdeen area has seen human settlement for at least 8,000 years. The city began as two separate burghs: Old Aberdeen at the mouth of the river Don; and New Aberdeen, a fishing and trading settlement, where the Denburn waterway entered the river Dee estuary. The earliest charter was granted by William the Lion in 1179 and confirmed the corporate rights granted by David I.

In 1319, the Great Charter of Robert the Bruce transformed Aberdeen into a property-owning and financially independent community. Granted with it was the nearby Forest of Stocket, whose income formed the basis for the city's Common Good Fund which still benefits Aberdonians.

During the Wars of Scottish Independence, Aberdeen was under English rule, so Robert the Bruce laid siege to Aberdeen Castle before destroying it in 1308, followed by executing the English garrison. The city was burned by Edward III of England in 1336, but was rebuilt and extended. The city was strongly fortified to prevent attacks by neighbouring lords, but the gates were removed by 1770.

Aberdeen's medieval council registers survive from 1398 onwards and are exceptional for their quantity and continuity among surviving Scottish burgh records. The earliest eight volumes, from 1398 to 1511, have been included in the UNESCO UK Memory of the World Register, and have been edited in a digital edition.

During the Wars of the Three Kingdoms of 1644 to 1647 the city was plundered by both sides. In 1644, it was taken and ransacked by Royalist troops after the Battle of Aberdeen and two years later it was stormed by a Royalist force under the command of the George Gordon, 2nd Marquis of Huntly. In 1647 an outbreak of bubonic plague killed a quarter of the population. In the 18th century, a new Town Hall was built and the first social services appeared with the Aberdeen Infirmary at Woolmanhill in 1739 and the Aberdeen Lunatic Asylum in 1800.

The expensive infrastructure works led to the city becoming bankrupt in 1817 during the Post-Napoleonic depression, an economic downturn immediately after the Napoleonic Wars; but the city's prosperity later recovered. The increasing economic importance of Aberdeen and the development of the shipbuilding and fishing industries led to the construction of the present harbour including Victoria Dock and the South Breakwater, and the extension of the North Pier. Gas street lighting arrived in 1824 and an enhanced water supply appeared in 1830 when water was pumped from the Dee to a reservoir in Union Place. An underground sewer system replaced open sewers in 1865. The city was incorporated in 1891. Although Old Aberdeen has a separate history and still holds its ancient charter, it was annexed by the City of Aberdeen in 1891.

Over the course of the Second World War Aberdeen was attacked 32 times by the German Luftwaffe. One of the most devastating attacks was on Wednesday 21 April 1943 when 29 Luftwaffe Dornier 217s flying from Stavanger, Norway attacked the city between the hours of 22:17 and 23:04. A total of 98 civilians and 27 servicemen were killed, along with 12,000 houses damaged, after a mixture of 127 Incendiary, High Explosive and Cluster bombs were dropped on the city in one night.

Toponymy

The first element of the name is the Pictish word  'river mouth'. The second element is from the Celtic river goddess Devona.

Aberdeen is usually described as within the historical Pictish territory, and became Gaelic-speaking at some time in the medieval period. Old Aberdeen is the approximate location of Aberdon, the first settlement of Aberdeen; this literally means "the mouth of the Don". The Celtic word  means "river mouth", as in modern Welsh (Aberystwyth, Aberdare, Aberbeeg etc.).

Governance

Aberdeen is locally governed by Aberdeen City Council, which comprises forty-five councillors who represent the city's wards and is headed by the Lord Provost. The current Lord Provost is David Cameron. From May 2003 until May 2007 the council was run by a Liberal Democrat and Conservative Party coalition. Following the May 2007 local elections, the Liberal Democrats formed a new coalition with the Scottish National Party. After a later SNP by-election gain from the Conservatives, this coalition held 28 of the 43 seats. Following the election of 4 May 2017, the council was controlled by a coalition of Scottish Labour, Scottish Conservatives and independent councillors; the Labour councillors were subsequently suspended by Scottish Labour Party leader, Kezia Dugdale. Following Conservative losses in the May 2022 local elections, the Liberal Democrats and SNP agreed to work in partnership, agreed a policy programme and formed the Council’s administration.

Aberdeen is represented in the Parliament of the United Kingdom by three constituencies: Aberdeen North and Aberdeen South which are wholly within the Aberdeen City council area, and Gordon, which includes a large area of the Aberdeenshire Council area.

In the Scottish Parliament, the city is represented by three constituencies with different boundaries: Aberdeen Central and Aberdeen Donside are wholly within the Aberdeen City council area. Aberdeen South and North Kincardine includes the North Kincardine ward of Aberdeenshire Council. A further seven MSPs are elected as part of the North East Scotland electoral region. In the European Parliament the city was represented by six MEPs as part of the all-inclusive Scotland constituency.

Heraldry

The arms and banner of the city show three silver towers on red. This motif dates from at least the time of Robert the Bruce and represents the buildings that stood on the three hills of medieval Aberdeen: Aberdeen Castle on Castle Hill (today's Castlegate); the city gate on Port Hill; and a church on St Catherine's Hill (now levelled).

"Bon Accord" is the motto of the city and is French for "Good Agreement". Legend tells that its use dates from a password used by Robert the Bruce during the 14th-century Wars of Scottish Independence, when he and his men laid siege to the English-held Aberdeen Castle before destroying it in 1308. It is still widely present in the city, throughout street names, business names and the city's Bon Accord shopping mall.

The shield in the coat of arms is supported by two leopards. A local magazine is called the "Leopard" and, when Union Bridge was widened in the 20th century, small statues of the creature in a sitting position were cast and placed on top of the railing posts (known locally as Kelly's Cats). The city's toast is "Happy to meet, sorry to part, happy to meet again"; this has been commonly misinterpreted as the translation of Bon Accord.

Geography

Being sited between two river mouths, the city has little natural exposure of bedrock. The small amount of geophysics done, and occasional building-related exposures, combined with small exposures in the banks of the River Don, suggest that it is actually sited on an inlier of Devonian "Old Red" sandstones and silts. The outskirts of the city spread beyond the (inferred) limits of the outlier onto the surrounding metamorphic/ igneous complexes formed during the Dalradian period (approximately 480–600 million years ago) with sporadic areas of igneous Diorite granites to be found, such as that at the Rubislaw quarry which was used to build much of the Victorian parts of the city.

The city is built on many hills, with the original beginnings of the city growing from Castle Hill, St. Catherine's Hill and Windmill Hill. When compared to mainland Europe, Aberdeen is further north than almost all of Denmark and plenty of southern Sweden, being just south of Gothenburg in terms of latitude.

Climate
Aberdeen features an oceanic climate (Köppen Cfb). Aberdeen has far milder winter temperatures than one might expect for its northern location, although statistically it is the coldest city in the UK. During the winter, especially throughout December, the length of the day is very short, averaging 6 hours and 41 minutes between sunrise and sunset at winter solstice. As winter progresses, the length of the day grows fairly quickly, to 8 hours and 20 minutes by the end of January. Around summer solstice, the days will be around 18 hours long, having 17 hours and 55 minutes between sunrise and sunset. During this time of the year marginal nautical twilight lasts the entire night.

Two weather stations collect climate data for the area, Aberdeen/Dyce Airport, and Craibstone. Dyce tends to have marginally warmer daytime temperatures year round owing to its slightly lower elevation, though it is more susceptible to harsh frosts.

Demography

For the local council area of Aberdeen City the latest estimate (mid-2019) is 

In 1396, the population was about 3,000. By 1801, it had become 26,992, then 153,503 in 1901, and finally 182,467 in 1941.

The 2011 census showed that there are fewer young people in Aberdeen, with 16.4% under 16, opposed to the national average of 19.2%. According to the 2011 census Aberdeen is 91.9% white, ethnically, 24.7% were born outside Scotland, higher than the national average of 16%. Of this population 7.6% were born in other parts of the UK. 8.2% of Aberdonians stated to be from an ethnic minority (non-white) in the 2011 census, with 9,519 (4.3%) being Asian, with 3,385 (1.5%) coming from India and 2,187 (1.0%) being Chinese. The city has around 5,610 (2.6%) residents of African or Caribbean origin, which is a higher percentage than both Glasgow and Edinburgh.

In the household, there were 97,013 individual dwellings recorded in the city, of which 61% were privately owned, 9% privately rented and 23% rented from the council. The most popular type of dwellings are apartments which comprise 49% of residences followed by semi-detached at just below 22%.
The median income of a household in the city is £16,813 (the mean income is £20,292) (2005) which places approximately 18% households in the city below the poverty line (defined as 60% of the mean income). Conversely, an Aberdeen postcode has the second highest number of millionaires of any postcode in the UK.

Ethnicity

Religion

Christianity is the main religion practised in the city. Aberdeen's largest denominations are the Church of Scotland (through the Presbytery of Aberdeen) and the Roman Catholic Church, both with numerous churches across the city, with the Scottish Episcopal Church having the third-largest number. The most recent census in 2001 showed that Aberdeen has the highest proportion of non-religious residents of any city in Scotland, with nearly 43% of citizens claiming to have no religion and several former churches in the city have been converted into bars and restaurants. In the Middle Ages, the Kirk of St Nicholas was the only burgh kirk and one of Scotland's largest parish churches. Like a number of other Scottish kirks, it was subdivided after the Reformation, in this case into the East and West churches. At this time, the city also was home to houses of the Carmelites (Whitefriars) and Franciscans (Greyfriars), the latter of which surviving in modified form as the chapel of Marischal College.

St Machar's Cathedral was built twenty years after David I (1124–1153) transferred the pre-Reformation Diocese from Mortlach in Banffshire to Old Aberdeen in 1137. With the exception of the episcopate of William Elphinstone (1484–1511), building progressed slowly. Gavin Dunbar, who followed him in 1518, completed the structure by adding the two western spires and the southern transept. It is now a congregation of the Church of Scotland. Aberdeen has two other cathedrals: St. Mary's Cathedral is a Roman Catholic cathedral in Gothic style, erected in 1859. In addition, St. Andrew's Cathedral serves the Scottish Episcopal Church. It was constructed in 1817 as Archibald Simpson's first commission and contains a memorial to the consecration of the first bishop of the Episcopal Church in the United States of America, which took place nearby. In 1804, St Peter's Church, the first permanent Roman Catholic church in the city after the Reformation was built.

Numerous other Protestant denominations have a presence in Aberdeen. The Salvation Army citadel on the Castlegate dominates the view of east end of Union Street. In addition, there is a Unitarian church, established in 1833 and located in Skene Terrace. Christadelphians have been present in Aberdeen since at least 1844. Over the years, they have rented space to meet at a number of locations and currently meet in the Inchgarth Community Centre in Garthdee. There is also a Quaker meetinghouse on Crown street, the only purpose built Friends meeting house in Scotland that is still in use today. In addition, there are a number of Baptist congregations in the city, and Evangelical congregations have been appearing in significant numbers since the late 2000s. The city also has two meeting houses of the Church of Jesus Christ of Latter-day Saints (LDS Church).

There are also four mosques in Aberdeen which serve the Islamic community in the city.  There is an Orthodox Jewish Synagogue established in 1945. There is also a Thai Buddhist temple located in the Hazelhead area of the city. There are no formal Hindu buildings, although the University of Aberdeen has a small Baháʼí society and there is a fortnightly Hindu religious gathering in the first and third Sunday afternoons at Queens Cross Parish church hall.

Economy

Traditionally, Aberdeen was home to fishing, textile mills, shipbuilding and paper-making. These industries have been largely replaced. High technology developments in the electronics design and development industry, research in agriculture and fishing and the oil industry, which have been largely responsible for Aberdeen's economic growth, are now major parts of Aberdeen's economy.

Until the 1970s, most of Aberdeen's leading industries dated from the 18th century; mainly these were textiles, foundry work, shipbuilding and paper-making, the oldest industry in the city, with paper having been first made there in 1694. Paper-making has reduced in importance since the closures of Donside Paper Mill in 2001 and the Davidson Mill in 2005 leaving the Stoneywood Paper Mill with a workforce of approximately 500. Textile production ended in 2004 when Richards of Aberdeen closed.

Grey granite was quarried at Rubislaw quarry for more than 300 years, and used for paving setts, kerb and building stones, and monumental and other ornamental pieces. Aberdeen granite was used to build the terraces of the Houses of Parliament and Waterloo Bridge in London. Quarrying finally ceased in 1971. The current owners have begun pumping 40 years of rainwater from the quarry with the aim of developing a heritage centre on the site.

In-shore fishing was once the predominant industry but was surpassed by deep-sea fisheries, which derived a great impetus from improved technologies throughout the 20th century. Catches have fallen because of overfishing and the use of the harbour by oil support vessels, and so although still an important fishing port it is now eclipsed by the more northerly ports of Peterhead and Fraserburgh. The Fisheries Research Services are headquartered in Aberdeen, and there is a marine research laboratory there.

Aberdeen is well regarded for the agricultural and soil research carried out at The James Hutton Institute (formerly the Macaulay Land Use Research Institute), which has close links to the city's two universities. The Rowett Research Institute is a world-renowned research centre for studies into food and nutrition located in Aberdeen. It has produced three Nobel laureates and there is a high concentration of life scientists working in the city.

As oil reserves in the North Sea decrease there is an effort to rebrand Aberdeen as "Energy Capital of Europe" rather than "Oil Capital of Europe", and there is interest in the development of new energy sources, and technology transfer from oil into renewable energy and other industries is underway. The "Energetica" initiative led by Scottish Enterprise has been designed to accelerate this process. Aberdeen has become a major world centre for undersea petroleum technology.

North Sea oil and gas

Aberdeen had been a major maritime centre throughout the 19th century, when a group of local entrepreneurs launched the first steam-powered trawler. The steam trawling industry expanded and by 1933 Aberdeen was Scotland's top fishing port, employing nearly 3,000 men with 300 vessels sailing from its harbour. By the time oil was coming on stream, much of the trawling fleet had relocated to Peterhead.

Geologists had speculated about the existence of oil and gas in the North Sea since the middle of the 20th century, but tapping its deep and inhospitable waters was another story. With the Middle Eastern oil sheiks becoming more aware of the political and economic power of their oil reserves and government threats of rationing, the industry began to consider the North Sea as a viable source of oil.

By late 1975, after years of intense construction, the necessary infrastructure was in place. Oil flowed through the Forties pipeline system directly to the refinery at far-away Grangemouth.

Business
In 2011, the Centre for Cities named Aberdeen as the best placed city for growth in Britain, as the country looked to emerge from the recent economic downturn. With energy still providing the backbone of the local economy, recent years have seen very large new investment in the North Sea owing to rising oil prices and favourable government tax incentives. This has led to several oil majors and independents building new global offices in the city.

Five of Scotland's top ten businesses are based in Aberdeen with a collective turnover of £14 billion, yielding a profit in excess of £2.4 billion. Alongside this 29 of Scotland's top 100 businesses are located in Aberdeen with an employment rate of 77.9%, making it the second highest UK city for employment.

Figures released in 2016 ranked Aberdeen as having the second highest number of patents processed per person in the UK.

Shopping

The traditional shopping streets are Union Street and George Street, now complemented by shopping centres, including the Bon Accord Centre and the Trinity Shopping Centre. A £190 million retail development, Union Square, reached completion in late September/early October 2009. Major retail parks away from the city centre include the Berryden Retail Park, the Kittybrewster Retail Park and the Beach Boulevard Retail Park. Aberdeen Market has been rebuilt twice, but closed in 2020.

In March 2004, Aberdeen was awarded Fairtrade City status by the Fairtrade Foundation.

Landmarks

Aberdeen's architecture is known for its principal use during the Victorian era of granite, which has led to its local nickname of the Granite City.

Amongst the notable buildings in the city's main street, Union Street, are the Town and County Bank, the Music Hall, the Trinity Hall of the incorporated trades (originating between 1398 and 1527, although completely rebuilt in the 1860s), now a shopping mall; the former office of the Northern Assurance Company, and the National Bank of Scotland. In Castle Street, a continuation eastwards of Union Street, is the new Aberdeen Town House, a very prominent landmark in Aberdeen, built between 1868 and 1873 to a design by Peddie and Kinnear.

Alexander Marshall Mackenzie's extension to Marischal College on Broad Street, opened by King Edward VII in 1906, created the second largest granite building in the world (after the Escorial, Madrid).

In addition to the many fine landmark buildings, Aberdeen has many prominent public statues, three of the most notable being William Wallace at the junction between Union Terrace and Rosemount Viaduct, Robert Burns on Union Terrace above Union Terrace Gardens, and Robert the Bruce holding aloft the charter he issued to the city in 1319 on Broad Street, outside Marischal College.

Parks, gardens and open spaces

Aberdeen has long been famous for its 45 parks and gardens, and citywide floral displays which include two million roses, eleven million daffodils and three million crocuses. The city has won the Royal Horticultural Society's Britain in Bloom 'Best City' award ten times, the overall Scotland in Bloom competition twenty times and the large city category every year since 1968. However, despite recent spurious reports, Aberdeen has never been banned from the Britain in Bloom competition. The city won the 2006 Scotland in Bloom "Best City" award along with the International Cities in Bloom award. The suburb of Dyce also won the Small Towns award.

Duthie Park opened in 1899 on the north bank of the River Dee. It was named after and given to the city by Miss Elizabeth Crombie Duthie of Ruthrieston in 1881. Hazlehead Park, is large and forested, and located on the outskirts of the city.

Johnston Gardens is a small park of one hectare in the west end of the city. In 2002, the garden was named the best garden in the British Islands. Seaton Park, formerly the grounds of a private house, is on the edge of the grounds of St Machar's Cathedral and was acquired for the city in 1947.

Theatres and concert halls

Aberdeen has hosted several theatres throughout its history, some of which have subsequently been converted or destroyed. The most
famous include:
 His Majesty's Theatre (HMT), on Rosemount Viaduct
 The Tivoli, on Guild Street
 Capitol Theatre, on Union Street
 Aberdeen Arts Centre, on King Street
 The Palace Theatre, on Bridge Street
 The main concert hall is the Music Hall on Union Street, built in 1822.

Transport

Aberdeen Airport (ABZ), in Dyce in the north of the city, serves domestic and international destinations including France, the Netherlands, Spain, Ireland and Scandinavian countries. The heliport which serves the oil industry and rescue services is one of the world's busiest commercial heliports.

Aberdeen railway station is on the main UK rail network, LNER (London North Eastern Railway), and ScotRail has frequent direct trains to major cities Edinburgh, Glasgow and Inverness. London North Eastern Railway and the Caledonian Sleeper operate direct trains to London. The UK's longest direct rail journey runs from Aberdeen to Penzance. It is operated by CrossCountry, leaving Aberdeen at 08:20 and taking 13 hours and 23 minutes. Today, all railway services to the south run via Dundee. The faster mainline from Aberdeen to Perth via Forfar and Strathmore closed in 1967 as a result of the Beeching cuts, and the faster main line from Perth to Edinburgh via Glenfarg also subsequently closed in 1970.

There are six major roads in and out of the city. The A90 is the main arterial route into the city from the north and south, linking Aberdeen to Edinburgh (via the M90), Dundee, Brechin and Perth in the south and Ellon, Peterhead and Fraserburgh in the north. The A96 links Elgin and Inverness and the northwest. The A93 is the main route to the west, heading towards Royal Deeside and the Cairngorms. After Braemar, it turns south, providing an alternative tourist route to Perth. The A944 also heads west, through Westhill and on to Alford. The A92 was the original southerly road to Aberdeen prior to the building of the A90, and is now used as a tourist route, connecting the towns of Montrose and Arbroath and on the east coast. The A947 exits the city at Dyce and goes on to Newmachar, Oldmeldrum and Turriff finally ending at Banff and Macduff.

After first being mooted 60 years ago and being held up for the past five years by a number of legal challenges, the Aberdeen Western Peripheral Route was given the go-ahead after campaigners lost their appeal to the UK Supreme Court in October 2012. The  route was earmarked to be completed in 2018 and was hoped to significantly reduce traffic congestion in and around the city. Aberdeen Harbour is important as the largest in the north of Scotland and serves the ferry route to Orkney and Shetland. Established in 1136, the harbour has been referred to as the oldest business in Britain.

FirstGroup operates the city buses under the name First Aberdeen, as the successor of Grampian Regional Transport (GRT) and Aberdeen Corporation Tramways. Aberdeen is the global headquarters of FirstGroup plc, having grown from the GRT Group. First is still based at the former Aberdeen Tramways depot on King Street, which has now been redeveloped into a new headquarters and bus depot.

National Express operate express coach services to London twice daily. The 590 service, operated by Bruce's Coaches of Salsburgh operates in the morning and runs through the day, calling at Dundee, Perth, Glasgow, Hamilton, Carlisle, Milton Keynes, Golders Green and Victoria Coach Station, whilst the 592 (operated by Parks of Hamilton) leaves in the evening and travels overnight, calling at Dundee, Glasgow, Hamilton, Carlisle, Heathrow Airport and Victoria Coach Station.

Two popular footpaths along old railway lines are the Deeside Way to Banchory (which will eventually connect to Ballater) and the Formartine and Buchan Way to Ellon, both used by a mixture of cyclists, walkers and occasionally horses.

The Dee Estuary, Aberdeen's harbour, has continually been improved. Starting out as a fishing port, moving onto steam trawlers, the oil industry, it is now a major port of departure for the Baltic and Scandinavia.

There are two railway stations in Aberdeen. Aberdeen Railway Station in the city centre, and Dyce Railway Station in Dyce, to the north of the city centre.

Education

Universities and colleges

Aberdeen has two universities, the ancient University of Aberdeen, and Robert Gordon University, a modern university often referred to as RGU. Aberdeen's student rate of 11.5% is higher than the national average of 7%.

The University of Aberdeen began as King's College, Aberdeen, which was founded in 1495 by William Elphinstone (1431–1514), Bishop of Aberdeen and Chancellor of Scotland. Marischal College, a separate institution, was founded in "New" Aberdeen by George Keith, fifth Earl Marischal of Scotland in 1593. These institutions were merged by order of Parliament in 1860 to form the University of Aberdeen. The university is the fifth oldest in the English-speaking world and offers degrees in a full range of disciplines. Its main campus is in Old Aberdeen in the north of the city and it currently has approximately 14,000 students. The university's debating society is the oldest in Scotland, founded in 1848 as the King's College Debating Society. Today, Aberdeen is consistently ranked among the top 200 universities in the world and is ranked within the top 20 universities in the United Kingdom. Aberdeen was also named the 2019 Scottish University of the Year by The Times and Sunday Times Good University Guide. In early 2022, Aberdeen opened the Science Teaching Hub.

Robert Gordon's College (originally Robert Gordon's Hospital) was founded in 1750 by the merchant Robert Gordon, grandson of the map maker Robert Gordon of Straloch, and was further endowed in 1816 by Alexander Simpson of Collyhill. Originally devoted to the instruction and maintenance of the sons of poor burgesses of guild and trade in the city, it was reorganised in 1881 as a day and night school for secondary and technical education. In 1903, the vocational education component of the college was designated a Central Institution and was renamed as the Robert Gordon Institute of Technology in 1965. In 1992, university status was awarded and it became Robert Gordon University. The university has expanded and developed significantly in recent years, and was named Best Modern University in the UK for 2012 by The Sunday Times. It was previously The Sunday Times Scottish University of the Year for 2011, primarily because of its record on graduate employment. The citation for the 2011 award read: "With a graduate unemployment rate that is lower than the most famous universities, including Oxford and Cambridge, plus a flourishing reputation for research, high student satisfaction rates and ambitious plans for its picturesque campus, the Robert Gordon University is The Sunday Times Scottish University of the Year".

Aberdeen is also home to two artistic schools: Gray's School of Art, founded in 1886, which is one of the oldest established colleges of art in the UK. Scott Sutherland School of Architecture and Built Environment, was one of the first architectural schools to have its training courses recognised by the Royal Institute of British Architects. Both are now part of Robert Gordon University and are based at its Garthdee campus. North East Scotland College has several campuses in the city and offers a wide variety of part-time and full-time courses leading to several different qualifications in science. The Scottish Agricultural College is based just outside Aberdeen, on the Craibstone Estate. This is situated beside the roundabout for Aberdeen Airport on the A96. The college provides three services—Learning, Research and Consultancy. The college features many land-based courses such as Agriculture, Countryside Management, Sustainable Environmental Management and Rural Business Management. There are a variety of courses from diplomas to master's degrees. The Marine Laboratory Aberdeen, which specialises in fisheries, Macaulay Land Use Research Institute (soil science), and the Rowett Research Institute (animal nutrition) are some other higher education institutions.

The Aberdeen College of Performing Arts also provides full-time Drama and Musical Theatre training at Further Education level.

Schools

There are currently 15 secondary schools and 54 primary schools which are run by the city council. There are a number of private schools in Aberdeen: Robert Gordon's College, Albyn School for Girls (co-educational as of October 2022), St Margaret's School for Girls, the International School of Aberdeen and a Waldorf/Steiner School.

State primary schools in Aberdeen include Airyhall Primary School, Ashley Road Primary School, Balgownie Primary School, Bramble Brae Primary School, Broomhill Primary School, Cornhill Primary School (the city's largest), Culter Primary School, Cults Primary School, Danestone Primary School, Fernielea Primary school, Ferryhill Primary School, Gilcomstoun Primary School, Glashieburn Primary School, Greenbrae School, Hamilton School, Kaimhill Primary School, Kingsford Primary School, Kittybrewster Primary School, Middleton Park Primary School, Mile End School, Muirfield Primary School, Skene Square Primary School, and St. Joseph's Primary School.

State secondary schools in Aberdeen include Aberdeen Grammar School, Albyn School, Bridge of Don Academy, Bucksburn Academy, Cults Academy, Dyce Academy, Harlaw Academy, Hazlehead Academy, Lochside Academy, Northfield Academy, Oldmachar Academy, Robert Gordon's College, St Machar Academy, St Margaret's School for Girls, and The International School Aberdeen.

Independent primary schools in Aberdeen include Albyn School, Robert Gordon's College, St Margaret's School for Girls, and the International School of Aberdeen.

Culture
The city has a wide range of cultural activities, amenities, and museums, and is regularly visited by Scotland's National Arts Companies.

It was awarded the Nicholson Trophy for the best-kept town at the Britain in Bloom contest in 1975.

Museums and galleries

The Aberdeen Art Gallery houses a collection of Impressionist, Victorian, Scottish and 20th-century British paintings as well as collections of silver and glass. It also includes The Alexander Macdonald Bequest, a collection of late 19th-century works donated by the museum's first benefactor and a constantly changing collection of contemporary work and regular visiting exhibitions. The Aberdeen Art Gallery reopened in 2019 after a four-year refurbishment costing £34.6m.

The Aberdeen Maritime Museum, located in Shiprow, tells the story of Aberdeen's links with the sea from the days of sail and clipper ships to the latest oil and gas exploration technology. It includes an  model of the Murchison oil production platform and a 19th-century assembly taken from Rattray Head lighthouse
Provost Ross' House is the second oldest dwelling house in the city. It was built in 1593 and became the residence of Provost John Ross of Arnage in 1702. The house retains some original medieval features, including a kitchen, fireplaces and beam-and-board ceilings. The Gordon Highlanders Museum tells the story of one of Scotland's best known regiments.

Provost Skene's House on Flourmill Lane dates from 1545 and is the oldest surviving townhouse in the city. It reopened in October 2021 after significant refurbishment costing £3.8m. One of the new exhibitions is a Hall of Heroes featuring 100 Aberdonians who have made a significant contribution to the city.

The Tollbooth Museum on the Castlegate (currently closed to visitors) is a former gaol, which first opened as a public museum in 1995.

The Aberdeen Treasure Hub is a storage facility for Aberdeen Museums and Galleries containing over 100,000 items. The store is open for infrequent tours, for example as part of Doors Open Day.

Marischal Museum holds the principal collections of the University of Aberdeen, comprising some 80,000 items in the areas of fine art, Scottish history and archaeology, and European, Mediterranean and Near Eastern archaeology. The permanent displays and reference collections are augmented by regular temporary exhibitions, and since its closure to the public it now has a virtual online presence It closed to the public in 2008. The King's Museum acts as the main museum of the university now.

Festivals and performing arts
Aberdeen is home to a number of events and festivals including the Aberdeen International Youth Festival (the world's largest arts festival for young performers), Aberdeen Jazz Festival, Aberdeen Alternative Festival, Rootin' Aboot (a folk and roots music event), Triptych, the University of Aberdeen's annual May Fest (formerly the Word festival) and DanceLive, Scotland's only festival of contemporary dance, produced by the city's Citymoves dance organisation.

The Aberdeen Student Show, performed annually without interruption since 1921, under the auspices of the Aberdeen Students' Charities Campaign, is the longest-running of its kind in the United Kingdom. It is written, produced and performed by students and graduates of Aberdeen's universities and higher education institutions. Since 1929—other than on a handful of occasions—it has been staged at His Majesty's Theatre.

National festivals which visited Aberdeen in 2012 included the British Science Festival in September, hosted by the University of Aberdeen but with events also taking place at Robert Gordon University and at other venues across the city. In February 2012 the University of Aberdeen also hosted the Inter Varsity Folk Dance Festival, the longest-running folk festival in the United Kingdom.

Aberdeen is home to Spectra, an annual light festival hosted in different locations across the city.

Aberdeen is home to Nuart, a festival showcasing street art around the city. The festival has run since 2017.

Music and film

Music venues include Aberdeen Music Hall.

Dialect

The local dialect of Lowland Scots is often known as Doric and is spoken not just in the city, but across the northeast of Scotland. It differs somewhat from other Scots dialects most noticeable are the pronunciation "f'" for what is normally written "wh" and "ee" for what in standard English would usually be written "oo" (Scots "ui"). Every year the annual Doric Festival takes place in Aberdeenshire to celebrate the history of the north-east's language.

Media

Aberdeen is home to Scotland's oldest newspaper the Press and Journal, a local and regional newspaper first published in 1747. The Press and Journal and its sister paper the tabloid Evening Express are printed six days a week by Aberdeen Journals. There was one free newspaper, the Aberdeen Citizen. BBC Scotland has a network studio production base in the city's Beechgrove area, and BBC Aberdeen produces The Beechgrove Potting Shed for radio while Tern Television produces The Beechgrove Garden. The city is also home to STV North (formerly Grampian Television), which produces the regional news programmes such as STV News at Six, as well as local commercials. The station, based at Craigshaw Business Park in Tullos, was based at larger studios in Queens Cross from September 1961 until June 2003.

There are three commercial radio stations operating in the city: Northsound Radio, which runs Northsound 1 and Northsound 2, and independent station Original 106. Other radio stations include NECR FM (North-East Community Radio FM) DAB station, and shmu FM managed by Station House Media Unit which supports community members to run Aberdeen's full-time community radio station, broadcasting on 99.8 MHz FM.

Food
The Aberdeen region has given its name to a number of dishes, including the Aberdeen buttery (also known as "rowie") and Aberdeen Sausage.

In 2015, a study was published in The Scotsman which analysed the presence of branded fast food outlets in Scotland. Of the ten towns and cities analysed, Aberdeen was found to have the lowest per capita concentration, with just 0.12 stores per 1,000 inhabitants.

Sport

Football
The first ever recorded game of football, was outlined by teacher David Wedderburn in his book "Vocabula" written in 1633, during his time teaching at Aberdeen Grammar School.

There are two Aberdeen-based football clubs in the SPFL, the senior branch of Scottish football. Aberdeen F.C. (The Dons) play in the Scottish Premiership at Pittodrie Stadium. The club won the European Cup Winners Cup and the European Super Cup in 1983, the Scottish Premier League Championship four times (1955, 1980, 1984 and 1985), and the Scottish Cup seven times (1947, 1970, 1982, 1983, 1984, 1986 and 1990). Under the management of Alex Ferguson, Aberdeen was a major force in British football during the 1980s.

After 8 seasons in charge, the most recent of Managers Derek McInnes, was relieved of his duties, the club's failure to achieve anything more than 1 trophy in 24 competitions during his tenure and a recent run of games which saw 1 goal in ten matches ultimately proved costly for the Manager and his Assistant Tony Docherty. Under the management of McInnes the team won the 2014 Scottish League Cup and followed it up with a second-place league finish for the first time in more than 20 years in the following season.  But it was over the last few seasons that results stagnated and McInnes was replaced by former Aberdeen and Newcastle player Stephen Glass.

The other senior team is Cove Rangers of League One, who play at Balmoral Stadium in the suburb of Cove Bay. Cove won the Highland Football League championship in 2001, 2008, 2009, 2013 and 2019, winning the League Two play-offs in 2019 and earning promotion. At the point at which the 2019/20 League Two season was curtailed due to the COVID-19 pandemic, Cove was sitting top of the League Two table and were promoted as Champions.

Local junior teams include Banks O' Dee F.C., Culter F.C., F.C. Stoneywood, Glentanar F.C., Sunnybank and Hermes F.C.

Rugby Union
Aberdeen hosted Caledonia Reds, a Scottish rugby team, before they merged with the Glasgow Warriors in 1998. The city is also home to the Scottish Premiership Division One rugby club Aberdeen GSFP RFC who play at Rubislaw Playing Fields, and Aberdeenshire RFC which was founded in 1875 and runs Junior, Senior Men's, Senior Ladies and Touch sections from the Woodside Sports Complex and also Aberdeen Wanderers RFC.

In 2005 the President of the SRU said it was hoped eventually to establish a professional team in Aberdeen. In November 2008 the city hosted a rugby international at Pittodrie between Scotland and Canada, with Scotland winning 41–0. In November 2010 the city once again hosted a rugby international at Pittodrie between Scotland and Samoa, with Scotland winning 19–16.

Rugby League
Aberdeen Warriors rugby league team play in the Rugby League Conference Division One. The Warriors also run Under 15's and 17's teams. Aberdeen Grammar School won the Saltire Schools Cup in 2011.

Golf

The Royal Aberdeen Golf Club, founded in 1780 is the sixth oldest golf club in the world, and hosted the Senior British Open in 2005, and the amateur team event the Walker Cup in 2011. Royal Aberdeen also hosted the Scottish Open in 2014, won by Justin Rose. The club has a second course, and there are public golf courses at Auchmill, Balnagask, Hazlehead and King's Links.

There are new courses planned for the area, including world-class facilities with major financial backing, the city and shire are set to become important in golf tourism. In Summer 2012, Donald Trump opened a new state of the art golf course at Menie, just north of the city, as the Trump International Golf Links, Scotland.

Swimming
The City of Aberdeen Swim Team (COAST) was based in Northfield swimming pool, but since the opening of the Aberdeen Aquatics Centre in 2014, it is now based there, as it has a 50 m pool as opposed to the 25 m pool at Northfield. It has been in operation since 1996. The team comprises several smaller swimming clubs and has enjoyed success throughout Scotland and in international competitions. Three of the team's swimmers qualified for the 2006 Commonwealth Games.

Rowing

There are four boat clubs that row on the River Dee: Aberdeen Boat Club (ABC), Aberdeen Schools Rowing Association (ASRA), Aberdeen University Boat Club (AUBC) and Robert Gordon University Boat Club (RGUBC).

Cricket
The city has one national league side, Stoneywood-Dyce. Local "Grades" cricket has been played in Aberdeen since 1884. Aberdeenshire were the 2009 and 2014 Scottish National Premier League and Scottish Cup Champions.

Ice hockey
Aberdeen Lynx are an ice hockey team that plays in the Scottish National League and is based at the Linx Ice Arena.

Shinty

Aberdeen University Shinty Club (Scottish Gaelic:Club Camanachd Oilthigh Obar Dheathain) is the oldest constituted shinty club in the world, dating back to 1861.

Other sports
The city council operates public tennis courts in various parks including an indoor tennis centre at Westburn Park. The Beach Leisure Centre is home to a climbing wall, gymnasium and a swimming pool. There are numerous swimming pools dotted around the city notably the largest, the Bon Accord Baths which closed down in 2008.

In common with many other major towns and cities in the UK, Aberdeen has an active roller derby league, Granite City Roller Derb.

American Football
The Aberdeen Roughnecks American football club is a new team that started in 2012 and is the first team that Aberdeen has witnessed since the Granite City Oilers that began in 1986 and were wound up in the mid-1990s.

Aberdeen Oilers Floorball Club was founded in 2007. The club initially attracted a range of experienced Scandinavian and other European players who were studying in Aberdeen. Since their formation, Aberdeen Oilers have played in the British Floorball Northern League and went on to win the league in the 2008/09 season. The club played a major role in setting up a ladies league in Scotland. The Oilers' ladies team ended up second in the first ladies league season (2008/09).

Extreme Ironing

Public services

The public health service in Scotland, NHS Scotland provides for the people of Aberdeen through the NHS Grampian health board. Aberdeen Royal Infirmary is the largest hospital in the city and one of the largest in Europe (the location of the city's A&E department), Royal Aberdeen Children's Hospital, a paediatric hospital, Royal Cornhill Hospital for mental health, Aberdeen Maternity Hospital, an antenatal hospital, Woodend Hospital, which specialises in rehabilitation and long-term illnesses and conditions, and City Hospital and Woolmanhill Hospital, which host several out-patient clinics and offices. Albyn Hospital is a private hospital located in the west end of the city.

Aberdeen City Council is responsible for city-owned infrastructure which is paid for by a mixture of council tax and income from HM Treasury. Infrastructure and services run by the council include: clearing snow in winter, city wardens, maintaining parks, refuse collection, sewage, street cleaning and street lighting. Infrastructure in private hands includes electricity, gas and telecoms. Water supplies are provided by Scottish Water.

Police: Policing in Aberdeen is the responsibility of Police Scotland (the British Transport Police has responsibility for railways). The Grampian Division of Police Scotland headquarters (and Aberdeen divisional headquarters) is located in Queen Street, Aberdeen.
Ambulance: The North East divisional headquarters of the Scottish Ambulance Service is located in Aberdeen.
Fire and rescue: This is the responsibility of the Scottish Fire and Rescue Service.
Lifeboat: The Royal National Lifeboat Institution operates Aberdeen Lifeboat Station. It is located at Victoria Dock Entrance in York Place.

Twin cities
Aberdeen is twinned with 
 Stavanger, Norway, since 1990
 Regensburg, Germany, since 1955
 Clermont-Ferrand, France, since 1983 
 Gomel, Belarus, since 1990 
 Bulawayo, Zimbabwe, since 1986 
 Houston, Texas, USA, since 1979, is twinned with the former region of Grampian of which Aberdeen is the regional centre
 Kobe, Japan, since 2022, is twinned with Aberdeen for its hydrogen work.

Notable people and residents

 William Alexander (1826 - 1894), journalist and author of Johnny Gibb of Gushetneuk.
 Leslie Benzies, Former president of Rockstar North, creators of the critically acclaimed Grand Theft Auto series.
 Scott Booth, former football player, played for Aberdeen F.C., FC Twente, Borussia Dortmund and the Scottish national football team.
 Alf Burnett, footballer who played for Dundee United 
 Lord Byron FRS (1788 – 1824), poet, was raised (age 2–10) in Aberdeen.
 Andrew Cant, (1584–1663) Presbyterian minister and leader of the Scottish Covenanters
 David Carry, swimmer, 2x 2006 Commonwealth Games gold medallist.
 Henry Cecil, one of the most successful horse trainers of all time.
 Oswald Chambers, author of My Utmost for His Highest
 Alexander Christie, portrait painter.
 Dan Crenshaw, Member of the U.S. House of Representatives from Texas's 2nd district.
 Andrew Cruickshank, actor famous for his role in Dr Finlay's Casebook
 John Mathieson Dodds, apprentice and engineer with Metrovick, Manchester and radar pioneer in Chain Home defence system for 1940 Battle of Britain.
 Neil Fachie, cyclist, 2012 Paralympic Games gold and silver medalist.
 Simon Farquhar, playwright.
 Graeme Garden, author, actor, comedian, artist, TV presenter, famous for The Goodies.
 Martin Gatt, principal bassoonist English Chamber Orchestra, LPO and LSO.
 Ryan Gauld, footballer who currently plays for Sporting Lisbon in the Portuguese Primeira Liga.
 James Gibbs, 18th-century architect.
 James Gregory FRS (1638 – 1675), Scottish mathematician and astronomer, born in the manse at Drumoak, just outside Aberdeen. Attended Aberdeen Grammar School and Marischal College, University of Aberdeen. Discovered diffraction gratings a year after Newton's prism experiments, and invented the Gregorian telescope design in 1663 which is used in telescopes such as the Arecibo Observatory.
 David Gregory FRS (1659 – 1708), Scottish mathematician and astronomer. Attended Aberdeen Grammar School and Marischal College, University of Aberdeen. A professor of mathematics. Based on  his uncle James Gregory's work, he extended or discovered the method of quadratures by infinite series. His principle work "Astronomiae physicae et geometricae elementa" (1702) was the first text-book on gravitational principles.
 Michael Gove, politician and MP.
 George Jamesone, Scotland's first eminent portrait-painter.
 Reginald Victor Jones, physicist, Chair of Natural Philosophy at the University of Aberdeen, author.
 John Michael Kosterlitz, physicist, professor of physics at Brown University. Awarded the Nobel Prize in physics in 2016.
 Denis Law, former football player, played for Manchester City, Manchester United and the Scottish national football team, joint all-time record Scotland goalscorer with 30 goals.
 Paul Lawrie, golfer, winner of the 1999 Open Championship.
 Annie Lennox, musician, winner of eight Brit Awards, grew up in Ellon.
 Rose Leslie, actress, best known for playing Ygritte in HBO's Game of Thrones.
 John James Rickard Macleod FRSE FRS LLD (1876 – 1935) Biochemist and Physiologist. For his role in the discovery and isolation of insulin he was awarded the Nobel Prize for Physiology or Medicine in 1923.
 John Alexander MacWilliam FRS (1857 – 1937), Professor of the Institutes of Medicine (later Physiology) at the University of Aberdeen. Pioneer in the field of cardiac electro-physiology & ventricular fibrillation of the heart. First to propose ventricular fibrillation as the most common cause of sudden death through heart attack. First to propose use of life saving electrical de-fibrilators. His work laid the frame work for the development of the pace maker.
 Laura Main, actress, best known for playing Sister Bernadette/Shelagh Turner in the BBC's Call the Midwife
 James Clerk Maxwell FRSE FRS (1831 – 1879), Chair of Natural Philosophy at Marischal College, University of Aberdeen from 1856 to 1860. Formulated the classical theory of electromagnetic radiation.
 Robert Morison (1620 – 1683), a Scottish botanist and taxonomist. He elucidated and developed the first systematic classification of plants. Gained his Master of Arts from the University of Aberdeen at the age of eighteen. For ten years Director of Louis XIV's royal gardens at Blois, France, then physician, botanist & superintendent of all royal gardens for Charles II of Scotland.
 Alberto Morrocco OBE FRSA FRSE RSW RP RGI LLD (1917 – 1998), Scottish artist and teacher famous for his landscapes of Scotland and abroad.
 Andy Nisbet (1953 – 2019), a Scottish mountaineer, guide, climbing instructor, and editor of climbing guidebooks. A pioneer of mixed rock and ice climbing techniques over 45 years. Developed over 1,000 new winter climbing routes in Scotland.
 Ara Paiaya, film producer and director of Skin Traffik, Instant Death and Purge of Kingdoms.
 Robbie Renwick, swimmer, 1x 2010 Commonwealth Games gold medalist.
 Professor Sir C. Duncan Rice, historian, former principal of the University of Aberdeen.
 Lawson Robertson (1883 – 1951), born in Aberdeen, competed for the U.S. Olympic Team at the 1904 Olympics in St. Louis, winning the bronze medal in the standing high jump. Head coach of U.S. track team at 4 successive Olympic games, 1924, 1928, 1932, 1936.
 Archibald Simpson, architect, one of Aberdeen's major architects.
 John Smith, architect, Aberdeen's other major architect and official City Architect
 Nicol Stephen, former Scottish Liberal Democrats leader, former Deputy First Minister of Scotland
 John Strachan, first Anglican Bishop of Toronto.
 Annie Wallace, actress in Hollyoaks.
 Ron Yeats, former football player, captain of the first great Liverpool team of the 1960s, also played for the Scottish national football team.

Aberdeen in popular culture
Stuart MacBride's crime novels Cold Granite, Dying Light, Broken Skin, Flesh House, Blind Eye and Dark Blood (a series with main protagonist, DS Logan McRae) are all set in Aberdeen.
A large part of the plot of the World War II thriller Eye of the Needle by Welsh author, Ken Follett, takes place in wartime Aberdeen, from which a German spy is trying to escape to a submarine waiting offshore.
A portion of Ian Rankin's novel Black and Blue (1997) is set in Aberdeen, where its nickname "Furry Boots" is noted.
 Songs titled "Aberdeen" have been recorded by the music groups Danny Wilson, Royseven, and Cage the Elephant. 
 The Scottish rock band The Xcerts released the song "Aberdeen 1987" on their debut album In the Cold Wind We Smile, released on 30 March 2009. The first verse contains the line "15, sitting in a graveyard talking about their history". The graveyard referenced in the song is the graveyard of the Kirk of St Nicholas on Union Street.

See also

Aberdeen Bestiary
Aberdeen City Youth Council
Aberdeen Safer Community Trust
Aberdeen typhoid outbreak 1964
Aberdonia (disambiguation)
List of places in Aberdeen
List of places in Scotland
Our Lady of Aberdeen
Voluntary Service Aberdeen
Freedom of the City of Aberdeen

Notes

References

Further reading
 
 
 
Shepherd, Mike (2015). Oil Strike North Sea: A first-hand history of North Sea oil. Luath Press.

External links

 Aberdeen City Council

 A collection of historic maps of Aberdeen from the 1660s onward at National Library of Scotland
 A selection of archive films relating to Aberdeen at the Scottish Screen Archive
 Engraving of Aberdeen in 1693 by John Slezer at National Library of Scotland
 

 
Cities in Scotland
Council areas of Scotland
Fishing communities in Scotland
Lieutenancy areas of Scotland
Port cities and towns in Scotland
Port cities and towns of the North Sea
Royal burghs
Grampian